The Gourley's Opera House, on Second St. in Rushville, Nebraska, was built in 1914.
It is a "one-part commercial block" building, and has been known as Star Theatre, as S & S Theatre, and as Plains Theatre.

It was built by Dave Gourley, who brought electricity to Rushville. The building was one of the first in Rushville to have electricity and was used as an entertainment venue.

It was listed on the National Register of Historic Places in 1988.

References

External links 

Theatres on the National Register of Historic Places in Nebraska
Theatres completed in 1914
Buildings and structures in Sheridan County, Nebraska
National Register of Historic Places in Sheridan County, Nebraska
Opera houses on the National Register of Historic Places in Nebraska
Opera houses in Nebraska